Norfolk Creek is a tributary of the Yellow River in Iowa.  in length, it rises just to the west of the city of Waukon in Union Prairie and Ludlow townships. It joins the Yellow River in  Jefferson Township, Allamakee County. It courses through entirely rural countryside, much of it forested. The original name of this creek was North Fork of the Yellow River. North Fork was later corrupted in usage to Norfolk.

See also
List of rivers of Iowa

References

Environmental Protection Agency
Iowa Department of Agriculture
Allamakee County Streams

Rivers of Iowa
Rivers of Allamakee County, Iowa